This is a list of tennis players who have represented the Hungary Davis Cup team in an official Davis Cup match. Hungary has taken part in the competition since 1924.

Players

See also

 Lists of tennis players
 List of Hungarians

References

Lists of Davis Cup tennis players
Tennis, Davis Cup
Davis Cup team